Peter Joseph "Jack" van Tongeren (born 1947) is the former leader of the West Australian Neo-Nazi group Australian Nationalist Movement (ANM), a white supremacist and far-right group, and a successor organisation called the Australian Nationalist Worker's Union (ANWU). He served 13 years, one month, and six days in prison from 1989 to 2002 for theft and arson, having robbed and firebombed businesses owned by Asians in Western Australia. In the late 1980s it was revealed van Tongeren's father was of part-Javanese (Indonesian) ancestry. Nevertheless, Van Tongeren resumed anti-Asian activities upon his release in 2002, leading to further convictions, in 2006.

Biography 
Peter Joseph van Tongeren was born in the Netherlands in 1947 to a father of Dutch-Javanese descent, Rudi, and an Australian mother, Stella. The family later migrated to Australia. He joined the Australian army and saw action in Vietnam in 1971. Following his military service he travelled throughout Australia from 1979 to 1983 associating with a variety of far-right groups such as the South Australia League of Rights, the Tasmanian branch of the Anglo-Saxon Keltic Society (ASKS), Sydney based National Action (NA) neo-Nazi group, and the Los Angeles-based neo-Nazi American Worker's Party.

Australian Nationalist Movement 
Van Tongeren's involvement with the Sydney based National Action (NA) neo-Nazi group led to his running, unsuccessfully, for the Senate in the 1984 election on an independent ticket, attaining 1,077 votes (0.13%). He later left the group to form his own organisation, the Australian Nationalist Movement (ANM) in April 1985.

ANM's initial actions involved an extensive flyer-distribution campaign in Perth of more than 400,000 photocopied posters. The crude posters and fliers bore repetitive messages that included phrases such as "No Asians", "White Revolution The Only Solution", "Coloured Immigration: Trickle Is Now A Flood" and "Asians Out Or Racial War" and brought the organisation to the attention of the public. ANM is believed to have had approximately 100 loosely-affiliated members by the mid-1980s.

By 1988, ANM turned towards identifying with international neo-Nazi ideology with public expressions of Antisemitism and holocaust denial.

Commencement of criminal activities

February 1988 – August 1989 
ANM's criminal activity may have commenced in February 1988 when a member of the group's home was arsoned in a failed attempt at insurance fraud. ANM then turned towards arsoning and fire-bombing Asian-owned businesses with the intention of intimidating Asians and inciting a race war. Between September 1988 and May 1989, five restaurants were arsoned, and one was bombed leading to community tensions, vigilantism, and a decline in Asian investment.

Short on cash, ANM turned to theft, stealing an estimated $800,000 in goods during a series of warehouse robberies. They also bashed a left-wing anti-racist campaigner in a home invasion. A tip-off to the police led them to the location where ANM's stolen goods were being stored and the arrest of van Tongeren's associates, Russell Willey and John van Blitterswyk. Willey turned informant and collected recordings of the group's leadership leading to their arrest in August 1989. Following the arrest, two other members of ANM suspected fellow member David Locke to be a police informant and lured him into a Park in the suburb of Gosnells where he was beaten with iron bars and his throat slit.

The murder trial of the two men in June 1990 led to the trial of van Tongeren and the five other ANM members being aborted due to the media atmosphere at the time. At a second trial in August 1990, six members of ANM were found guilty, with van Tongeren was sentenced to 18 years on 53 counts. Van Tongeren was sentenced in absentia due to a hunger strike that commenced a few days into the trial. The two men who murdered David Locke received life sentences.

Willey would later participate in the filming of a documentary about the ANM, Nazi Supergrass, in 1993.

Australian Nationalist Worker's Union

Release from prison 
Van Tongeren expressed no remorse following his release from Karnet Prison Farm in September 2002. His first public statement accused the Western Australian premier Geoff Gallop and Attorney General Jim McGinty of pandering to the Asian minority. He also denied being a terrorist. He soon formed a successor organisation to the ANM called the Australian Nationalist Worker's Union, and expressed interest in seeking election. Banned under Western Australian law from running for state parliament, Van Tongeren was free to run for a seat in the federal parliament. This led to the Attorney-General calling on the Commonwealth Government to tighten laws on the eligibility of convicted criminals.

Resumption of racist attacks 
In February 2004 three Chinese restaurants in Perth were firebombed in the early hours of the morning. Other synagogues and Asian-owned shops where plastered with posters and daubed with swastikas. Van Tongeren denied responsibility, instead claiming that the attacks must be the actions of angry Australians reacting against "Asian gangs and African crime." It was later reported that Van Tongeren instigated the attacks to drum up publicity for his book, The ANM Story. Western Australian police launched "Operation Atlantic" in response to the attacks, leading to the arrest of five men involved in the attacks. The police also identified a plot to harm Jim McGinty and his family, two police officers and an ethnic community leader, and raided Van Tongeren's home. These threats led to Jim McGinty cancelling meetings in Adelaide and returning to Perth.

In August 2004 a week-long man-hunt for Van Tongeren ended with police receiving a tip-off that located him at an RSL club. Van Tongeren claimed to be innocent, and that he was only hiding from the police out of fear that they would shoot him. Following these arrests, the racist graffiti attacks around the Perth CBD ceased. In February 2006, Van Tongeren, out on bail pending his trial, failed to report to police and was believed to be at large and travelling with former ANM member Matthew Billing. On 23 March 2006, a letter was received by staff at ABC Television Studios, purporting to be from Van Tongeren. It claimed that charges against him were a conspiracy created by the WA Government, and indicated that they would need to be dropped by Attorney-General Jim McGinty, in order for Van Tongeren to return from hiding. A month later Van Tongeren and his co-accused Matthew Billing were found and arrested in the Boddington area south-east of Perth. Both men once again faced the courts over the 2004 arson plots.

During a hearing on 2 November, Van Tongeren collapsed, was taken to hospital, and later used a wheelchair. Van Tongeren was released from jail on the condition that he leave Western Australia.  He currently resides in the eastern states. In 2007 the ANM/ANWU was reported to have been disbanded.

See also 
 Australia First Party
 Far-right politics in Australia
 Jim Saleam
 National Socialist Party of Australia 
 List of white nationalist organizations

References 

1947 births
20th-century Australian criminals
Anti-Asian sentiment in Australia
Australian anti-communists
Australian Army soldiers
Australian arsonists
Australian fraudsters
Australian neo-Nazis
Australian people of Indonesian descent
Crime in Perth, Western Australia
Criminals from Western Australia
Dutch emigrants to Australia
Indo people
Living people
Terrorism in Australia
People convicted of arson
Australian people convicted of assault
People convicted of theft